The Port of Chicago consists of several major port facilities within the city of Chicago, Illinois, operated by the Illinois International Port District (formerly known as the Chicago Regional Port District). It is a multimodal facility featuring Senator Dan Dougherty Harbor (Lake Calumet), the Iroquois Landing Lakefront Terminus, and Harborside International Golf Center. The central element of the Port District, Calumet Harbor, is maintained by the U.S. Army Corps of Engineers.

The modern Port of Chicago links inland canal and river systems in the Midwestern United States to the Great Lakes, giving the global shipping market access to the St. Lawrence Seaway and linking the Atlantic Ocean to the Gulf of Mexico by way of the Mississippi River.

History
In 1951, the Illinois General Assembly authorized the creation of port districts in Illinois with the Chicago Regional Port District, to oversee harbor and port development, being the first such port district created. The State of Illinois and City of Chicago had relinquished all rights and interest in the bed of Lake Calumet to the Port District, so as to enable the District to develop Calumet Harbor. The district was given the power to acquire any navigable waters of the state which were within the District area. The constitutionality of the district was challenged in People v. Chicago Regional Port District. The plaintiffs, later the appellants, challenged the district on the grounds that the sale or lease of navigable waters by the State was prohibited and the State did not have the ability to establish special corporations. In 1954, the Illinois Supreme Court rejected the appellants to be constitutional.

In 1985, the Illinois International Port District was created by the Illinois International Port District Act as a political subdivision to run the Port of Chicago.

C.T.C. No. 1 
A 620-foot-long cargo hauler brought to the south Chicago ports in 1982. With a capacity of 16,300 tons, this ship was used for storage and transfer of cement until its termination in 2009. The ship hasn't moved since its termination and then purchase by the Grand River Navigation Co., Traverse City, MI.

Port Commerce & Foreign Trade Zone No. 22 
Illinois International Port District is responsible for Foreign Trade Zone No. 22. This zone spans 8 counties: Cook, DuPage, Grundy, Kankakee, Kendall, Lake, and Will Counties as well as portions of McHenry and Kane Counties. Around the Calumet zone the district maintains 20 acres of land for future developments as well as 400,000 square feet of warehouse space. At the mouth of the Calumet River is the Iroquois Landing Lakefront Terminus, this Area is utilized as Shipping container processing and storage space. The terminal currently handles    of paved concrete grounds as well as 3000 feet of boat and barge berths. The Iroquois Terminus is serviced with direct trucking and rail access supported by two transit sheds spanning 100,000 square feet including a 135 railcar staging area. About 6 miles along the Calumet River it feeds into Lake Calumet which contains two grain elevators maintained by the port authority and is reported to have a combined capacity of 14 million bushels, as well as liquid bulk storage of 800,000 barrels.

Governance

The Illinois International Port District Act creates a nine member board. Four members are appointed by the Governor of Illinois with the advice and consent of the Illinois Senate and five members are appointed by the Mayor of Chicago with the advice and consent of the Chicago City Council. The Illinois International Port District is the only port district in Illinois that may not levy taxes. By statute, the Executive Director of the IIPD is a member of the Task Force on the Conservation and Quality of the Great Lakes.

Reform efforts and proposals
In 2008, the Chicago Civic Federation proposed the dissolution of the Illinois International Port District. Under their plan, port operations and related lands would transfer to the City of Chicago; transfer of open land to the Forest Preserve District of Cook County; and transfer Harborside International Golf Center to the control of the Chicago Park District.

In July 2013, Chicago Mayor Rahm Emanuel and Governor of Illinois Illinois Governor Pat Quinn proposed a privatized revitalization of the Port Facilities and District area. Attempting to strike a deal with Private family-owned International Investment and Management company Broe Group. Negotiation for this revitalization ended on the negotiation table without definitive statement.

During the 100th Illinois General Assembly, Elaine Nekritz filed House Bill 2502 which, if signed into law, would have replaced the district’s current governing board with the Chicago City Council. The bill was referred to the Rules Committee and died at the end of the legislative session.

As of 2019, Chicago Metropolitan Agency for Planning (CMAP) is studying the District, Its facilities, and the surrounding area to provide a economic solution for the Port to operate out of the negative.

Facilities

Iroquois Landing Lakefront Terminal: 
 of warehouses and facilities.
780,000+ square meters (8.39 million square feet) of storage.
Lake Calumet terminal:
Transit sheds: 29,000 square meters (315,000 square feet).
900+ linear meters (3000 linear feet) of ship and barge berthing.
Approximately 1,600 acres.
Grain storage: 493,000 metric tons (14 million bushels)
Bulk liquid storage: 127 million liters (800,000 barrels)

References

Ports and harbors of Illinois
River ports of the United States
Foreign trade zones of the United States
Transportation in Chicago